Kududula Nagesh is an Indian politician, belonging to the Telangana Rashtra Samithi. Nagesh is a Member of the Andhra Pradesh Legislative Assembly, representing the Alair constituency. He born in a poor family in Raghavapuram village near to kolanpaka, Aler mandal, yadadri-bhongir district.                       His parents are Narsayya and Narsamma.

He started his 1st education in his village after he continued in Andra Pradesh social welfare school Bhongir. He continued his education in Andra Pradesh social welfare school Rajapet he completed his school education.

References

Year of birth missing (living people)
Living people
Members of the Andhra Pradesh Legislative Assembly